The Castle-class corvette was an ocean going convoy escort developed by the United Kingdom during the Second World War. The Castle-class was a general improvement over the smaller Flowers which were designed for coastal rather than open ocean use.

The Castle-class corvettes started appearing in service during late 1943.

Background
In mid-1939, the Admiralty ordered 175 Flower-class corvettes for protecting shipping on the east coast of Britain. They were designed to be built in large numbers in small shipyards and so not compete with other warships for construction. By the time the Flowers began entering service in late-1940, due to their long range they were required to undertake missions beyond coastal waters. The Flowers were unsuited for open-ocean escort missions in the North Atlantic, especially in poor weather; they lacked speed, endurance, and habitability but became the mainstay of the Mid-Ocean Escort Force protecting convoys crossing the Atlantic.

The larger Rivers were too expensive to produce at the required rate and needed larger slipways. The Castle was developed from a proposal by Smith's Dock Company – who had designed the Flower-class – for a stretched Flower. The result was a scaled-down version of the Loch for shipyards that only build corvettes using mainly traditional methods.

The design was approved in May 1943 and 96 Castles were ordered from yards in the UK and Canada. Fifteen British and all 37 Canadian ships were later cancelled; Canada receiving twelve British-built ships instead. The UK completed a further five as convoy rescue ships for its Merchant Navy. Four became weather ships after the war.

Design
The Castle resembled later Flowers with an extended forecastle and mast behind the bridge, but was 420 tons heavier and 37 feet longer. The Admiralty Experiment Works at Haslar developed an improved hull form which, in combination with the increased length, made the Castle at least half a knot faster than the Flower despite using the same engine. The Castle also had a single-screw. A lattice mainmast was used instead of the pole version fitted to the Flowers.

Construction used mainly traditional methods with as much welding as possible. Scantling was based on the Flower, but lightened in some areas. The wireless office (the same as on the Loch), the radar office, and the lattice mast were installed as prefabricated units.

The Castle was armed with a Squid anti-submarine mortar, directed by Type 145 and 147B ASDIC. The Flower used the older Hedgehog mortar and could not be fitted with Squid. The first operational Type 147 and Squid were installed aboard HMS Hadleigh Castle in September 1943.

In place of the BL 4-inch Mk IX main gun, the Castles had the new QF 4-inch Mk XIX gun on a High-Angle/Low-Angle mounting which could be used against aircraft as well as surface targets such as submarines.

In service
The Castle was criticized for being barely fast enough to fight German Type VII submarines and difficult to handle at low speed.

Ships

Royal Canadian Navy
The following vessels were all originally built for the Royal Navy, but were transferred to the RCN on completion (for details of builders and construction dates see under Royal Navy below). All their pennant numbers (except Hedingham Castle, which was never completed), as well as their names, were changed when transferred.
 HMCS Arnprior (K494) (ex-)
 HMCS Bowmanville (K493) (ex-), sold to Republic of China as cargo ship, but taken over by the Communist People's Liberation Army Navy after the end of the Chinese Civil War and rearmed with Soviet guns, entering PLAN service as Guangzhou.
 HMCS Copper Cliff (K495) (ex-)
 HMCS Hespeler (K489) (ex-) (later SS Chilcotin)
 HMCS Humberstone (K497) (ex-)
 HMCS Huntsville (K499) (ex-)
 HMCS Kincardine (K490) (ex-)
 HMCS Leaside (K492) (ex-, later SS Coquitlam II)
 HMCS Orangeville (K491) (ex-), sold to Republic of China as cargo ship, but taken over by the ROC Navy on 29 June 1950 and rearmed with US guns, entering ROCN service as De An (德安)
 HMCS Petrolia (K498) (ex-)
 HMCS St. Thomas (K488) (ex-, later SS Camosun III)
 HMCS Tillsonburg (K496) (ex-), sold to Republic of China as cargo ship, but taken over by ROCN on 29 June 1950 and rearmed with US guns, entering ROCN service as Kao An (高安)

Royal Navy
The first of the Castle-class were the prototypes Hadleigh Castle and Kenilworth Castle, ordered on 9 December 1942; another 12 vessels were also ordered on 9 December, also under the 1942 War Programme. The remaining eighty-one ships were all ordered for the RN under the 1943 War Programme, of which thirty were completed. Fifty-one of these ships (15 from UK shipyards and 36 from Canadian shipyards) were cancelled late in 1943.

Notes: (a) from the previous order placed for a Modified Flower-class corvette named Amaryllis.

Two of those ordered 3 March 1943, three ordered 4 May 1943 and two ordered 10 July 1943 were all cancelled, as were all thirty-six ordered from Canadian shipyards on 15 March 1943.

Royal Norwegian Navy
 HNoMS Tunsberg Castle –  was loaned to Norwegian on 17 April 1944. On 12 December 1944, she hit a mine and sank.

Cancelled 
Fifteen ships ordered for the Royal Navy from UK shipyards as part of the 1943 Programme were all cancelled on 31 October 1943:
 Caldecot Castle – ordered 19 January 1943 from John Brown & Company, Clydebank.
 Dover Castle – ordered 19 January 1943 from A. & J. Inglis, Glasgow.
 Dudley Castle – ordered 19 January 1943 from A. & J. Inglis, Glasgow.
 Bere Castle – ordered 23 January 1943 from John Brown & Company, Clydebank.
 Calshot Castle – ordered 23 January 1943 from John Brown & Company, Clydebank.
 Monmouth Castle (originally to have been Peel Castle) – ordered 23 January 1943 from John Lewis & Sons, Aberdeen.
 Rhuddlan Castle – ordered 23 January 1943 from John Crown & Sons, Sunderland.
 Thornbury Castle – ordered 23 January 1943 from Ferguson Brothers, Port Glasgow.
 Appleby Castle – ordered 3 March 1943 from Austin, at Sunderland.
 Tonbridge Castle – ordered 3 March 1943 from Austin, at Sunderland.
 Norwich Castle – ordered 4 May 1943 from John Brown & Company, Clydebank.
 Oswestry Castle – ordered 4 May 1943 from John Crown & Sons, Sunderland.
 Pendennis Castle – ordered 4 May 1943 from John Crown & Sons, Sunderland.
 Alton Castle – ordered 10 July 1943 from Fleming & Ferguson, Paisley.
 Warkworth Castle – ordered 10 July 1943 from Fleming & Ferguson, Paisley.

The following ships were ordered on 15 March 1943 for the Royal Navy from Canadian shipyards for completion between May 1944 and June 1945, but were all cancelled in December 1943:

 Aydon Castle
 Barnwell Castle
 Beeston Castle
 Bodiam Castle
 Bolton Castle
 Bowes Castle
 Bramber Castle
 Bridgnorth Castle
 Brough Castle
 Canterbury Castle
 Carew Castle
 Chepstow Castle
 Chester Castle
 Christchurch Castle
 Clare Castle
 Clavering Castle
 Clitheroe Castle
 Clun Castle
 Colchester Castle
 Corfe Castle
 Cornet Castle
 Cowes Castle
 Cowling Castle
 Criccieth Castle
 Cromer Castle
 Devizes Castle
 Dhyfe Castle
 Dunster Castle
 Egremont Castle
 Fotheringay Castle
 Helmsley Castle
 Malling Castle
 Malmesbury Castle
 Raby Castle
 Trematon Castle
 Tutbury Castle
 Wigmore Castle

Castles sunk or destroyed in action
 HNoMS Tunsberg Castle was sunk by a mine near Båtsfjord, Norway on 12 December 1944.

U-boats sunk by Castles

Film appearance
The final third of the film The Cruel Sea is set on the Castle-class corvette Saltash Castle (portrayed by ).

Post-war conversions
Three were converted to passenger/cargo ships for the Union Steamship Company of British Columbia and were known as the White Boats. They were operated from 1946 to 1958 but were heavy on fuel and had limited cargo capacity, for example they could not carry cars in the hold.
 SS Camosun III – ex-HMCS St. Thomas, HMS Sandgate Castle
 SS Chilcotin – ex-HMCS Hespeler, HMS Guildford Castle
 SS Coquitlam II – ex-HMCS Leaside, HMS Walmer Castle

References

Citations

Sources 

 
 
 Twigg, Arthur M.: Union Steamships Remembered: 1920–1958 (1997) .

External links

 Castle-class corvette (Frigate) Association
 Castle-class corvettes on U-Boat.net

Corvette classes